Laurent Clayton Jr. (born 18 July 1990) is a super heavyweight boxer from the United States Virgin Islands.

In 2016, he placed 3rd at the American Qualification Event for the 2016 Olympic Summer Games and qualified for the Olympic boxing tournament.

At the 2016 Summer Olympics, he defeated Erik Pfeifer of Germany in the first round, but was defeated by eventual gold medalist Tony Yoka of France in the next round. Clayton was the flag bearer for the United States Virgin Islands during the closing ceremony.

References

External links 
 
 https://web.archive.org/web/20160325181516/http://d152tffy3gbaeg.cloudfront.net/2016/02/C75-C75W92.pdf

Pan American Games competitors for the United States Virgin Islands
Olympic boxers of the United States Virgin Islands
Boxers at the 2011 Pan American Games
Boxers at the 2015 Pan American Games
Boxers at the 2016 Summer Olympics
1991 births
Living people
United States Virgin Islands male boxers
Super-heavyweight boxers